The 2010-2011 Tiburones Rojos de Veracruz season is the club's 67th year of existence.

Ese año las fuerzas básicas del club Sub - 13 se dieron a la alza con el trofeo que los define como el mejor equipo de México en su categoría, siendo protagonista él canterano Rafael Valdés Rincón con 3 goles en contra del club Santos Laguna juntando de local en la última fecha del torneo.

squad

 (Captain)

Match results

Apertura 2010

Clausura 2011

See also

Tiburones Rojos De Veracruz
C.D. Veracruz seasons